Alberto Ardines (born 4 July 1970) is a Spanish musician. He is working on a new alternative/power metal band called Sauze that he formed with Manuel Ramil, Fernando Mon, and Toni Amboaje.

Career 
Born in Oviedo, when he was almost 12 years old, he started getting interested in music, but it was not until he was 14 that he discovered his passion for heavy metal.  In 1989, he formed the band called Speed Demons with some friends from school.
After changing the band's name for Avalanch and leaving back some friends with the ones he started recorded some EPs, he went to the recording studio to make his first album Ready To The Glory, which was released in 1992.

In 1996, he began taking drumming classes with Fernando Arias a wonderful drummer, who taught him some different styles. That same year he entered the school of music of Llanera, Asturias, where he spent two years studying drums and musical language. With influences from Dave Wake, or Mike Portnoy and classes given by his particular professor he became a great drummer. A year later, his dream started becoming true, when he participated in a tour around Spain, which continued until 28 December 2001.

Throughout this time, he was either or learning or touring, which was not easy. Because of all his perseverance, he has been classified as one of the best drummers of Spain. But he says "I still have to learn a lot, and a person gotta go step by step".

During 2001, in his free time, he started recording a project with his band companion Víctor García, who would receive the name of WarCry.

Discography

Avalanch 
 1992 — Ready To The Glory
 1997 — La Llama Eterna
 1988 — Eternal Flame
 1999 — Llanto De Un Héroe
 2000 — Días De Gloria
 2001 — El Ángel Caído

Tributes 
 1999 — Transilvania 666 (Iron Maiden)
 2000 — The Attack of the Dragons (Queen)
 2000 — Metal Gods (Judas Priest)

WarCry 
 2002 — WarCry
 2002 — El Sello De Los Tiempos
 2004 — Alea Jacta Est
 2005 — ¿Dónde Está La Luz?
 2006 — Directo A La Luz
 2006 — La Quinta Esencia

Sauze 
 2008 — Nada Tiene Sentido

Last Days Of Eden 
 2015 - Ride The World

References

1970 births
Living people
People from Oviedo
Spanish heavy metal musicians
WarCry (band) members
Avalanch members